Scrobipalpa lagodes is a moth in the family Gelechiidae. It was described by Edward Meyrick in 1926. It is found in northern Kazakhstan.

The forewings are yellow brownish, slightly speckled with fuscous or whitish. The hindwings are light blue grey, thinly scaled.

The larvae feed on Atriplex cana.

References

Scrobipalpa
Moths described in 1926